is an anime series produced by Shaft based on a Japanese role-playing mobile game of the same name. The game and the anime series is a spin-off of the 2011 anime series Puella Magi Madoka Magica, and features a new protagonist named Iroha Tamaki, who arrives in Kamihama City to search for her missing sister.

The first season originally aired from January 5 to March 29, 2020, roughly covering the first half of the first arc of the Magia Record video game. The second season, titled The Eve of Awakening, aired from August 1 to September 26, 2021. The third and final season, titled Dawn of a Shallow Dream, aired in its entirety on April 3, 2022.

The first season is chief directed by Doroinu of Gekidan Inu Curry and has Yukihiro Miyamoto, series director of the original Madoka Magica, as assistant director. Miyamoto, alongside Kenjirou Okada and Midori Yoshizawa, rotated as directors across the first season (not episode directors). Akiyuki Shinbo is the animation supervisor, Junichirou Taniguchi is the character designer, and Takumi Ozawa composed the music. Taniguchi, Hiroki Yamamura (Shaft), and Nobuhiro Sugiyama (Shaft) are the chief animation directors. Yoshiaki Itou (Shaft), Akihisa Takano (Shaft), and Kana Miyai are the main animators. Episode 6 of the season was outsourced to CloverWorks.

The second season features returning chief director Doroinu, animation supervisor Shinbo, character designer Taniguchi, and composer Ozawa. However, unlike the first season, Miyamoto is instead the director, rather than rotating with Okada and Yoshizawa. While Taniguchi returns as chief animation director as well, Sugiyama and Yamamura are replaced by Itou and Rina Iwamoto as chief animation directors. Miyai and Takano return as main animators, and are joined by Hiroto Nagata and Kazuki Kawada (both of Shaft). Katsuhiko Katayama also joins the series as co-series composition writer.

The third season retains the same staff with a few changes: Taniguchi becomes the sole chief animation director, and Takano is no longer a main animator.


Episode list

Season 1

Season 2: The Eve of Awakening

Season 3: Dawn of a Shallow Dream

Notes

References

External links
 Official anime website 
 Official anime website

Magia Record
Puella Magi Madoka Magica